Yang Qipeng (born 14 May 1987) is a Chinese footballer who plays for Tianjin Teda in the Chinese Super League as a goalkeeper.

Club career
Yang started his professional career with Chinese Super League side Tianjin Teda in 2004. He became the first choice goalkeeper of the club in 2011. On 1 March, he made his senior debut in the first round of 2011 AFC Champions League group stage which Tianjin Teda beat K League side Jeju United 1–0 at Jeju World Cup Stadium. His performance in the AFC Champions League was described as "world-class" by media. However, he lost his position to Song Zhenyu who newly transferred from Chengdu Blades in July 2011. He won back his position in July 2012 after Costa Rican manager Alexandre Guimarães took charge of the club. He has been called up to the national team for the first time in 2017, during the preparation of the 2017 China Cup, but withdrew due to injury.

Career statistics 
Statistics accurate as of match played 31 December 2020.

Honours

Club
Tianjin Teda
 Chinese FA Cup: 2011

References

External links
 

1987 births
Living people
Chinese footballers
Footballers from Tianjin
Tianjin Jinmen Tiger F.C. players
Chinese Super League players
Association football goalkeepers